"The New Colossus" is a sonnet by American poet Emma Lazarus (1849–1887). She wrote the poem in 1883 to raise money for the construction of a pedestal for the Statue of Liberty (Liberty Enlightening the World). In 1903, the poem was cast onto a bronze plaque and mounted inside the pedestal's lower level.

History of the poem 

This poem was written as a donation to an auction of art and literary works conducted by the "Art Loan Fund Exhibition in Aid of the Bartholdi Pedestal Fund for the Statue of Liberty" to raise money for the pedestal's construction. Lazarus's contribution was solicited by fundraiser William Maxwell Evarts. Initially, she refused but writer Constance Cary Harrison convinced her that the statue would be of great significance to immigrants sailing into the harbor.

"The New Colossus" was the first entry read at the exhibit's opening on November 2, 1883. It remained associated with the exhibit through a published catalog until the exhibit closed after the pedestal was fully funded in August 1885, but was forgotten and played no role at the opening of the statue in 1886. It was, however, published in Joseph Pulitzer's New York World as well as The New York Times during this time period. In 1901, Lazarus's friend Georgina Schuyler began an effort to memorialize Lazarus and her poem, which succeeded in 1903 when a plaque bearing the text of the poem was put on the inner wall of the pedestal of the Statue of Liberty.

On the plaque hanging inside the Statue of Liberty, the line "Keep ancient lands, your storied pomp!" is missing a comma. In Lazarus's manuscript, that line reads, "Keep, ancient lands, your storied pomp!" The plaque also describes itself as an engraving; it is actually a casting.

The original manuscript is held by the American Jewish Historical Society.

Text of the poem

Interpretation 

The poem is a Petrarchan sonnet.

The title of the poem and the first two lines reference the Greek Colossus of Rhodes, one of the Seven Wonders of the Ancient World, a famously gigantic sculpture that stood beside or straddled the entrance to the harbor of the island of Rhodes in the 3rd century BC.  In the poem, Lazarus contrasts that ancient symbol of grandeur and empire ("the brazen giant of Greek fame") with a "New" Colossus – the Statue of Liberty, a female embodiment of commanding "maternal strength" ("Mother of Exiles"). 

The "sea-washed, sunset gates" are the mouths of the Hudson and East Rivers, to the west of Brooklyn. The "imprisoned lightning" refers to the electric light in the torch, then a novelty.

The "air-bridged harbor that twin cities frame" refers to New York Harbor between New York City and Brooklyn, which were separate cities at the time the poem was written, before being consolidated as boroughs of the City of Greater New York in 1898.

The "huddled masses" refers to the large numbers of immigrants arriving in the United States in the 1880s, particularly through the port of New York. Lazarus was an activist and advocate for Jewish refugees fleeing persecution in Tsarist Russia.

Influence

Immigration to the United States

Paul Auster wrote that "Bartholdi's gigantic effigy was originally intended as a monument to the principles of international republicanism, but 'The New Colossus' reinvented the statue's purpose, turning Liberty into a welcoming mother, a symbol of hope to the outcasts and downtrodden of the world."

John T. Cunningham wrote that "The Statue of Liberty was not conceived and sculpted as a symbol of immigration, but it quickly became so as immigrant ships passed under the torch and the shining face, heading toward Ellis Island. However, it was [Lazarus's poem] that permanently stamped on Miss Liberty the role of unofficial greeter of incoming immigrants."

The poem has entered the political realm. It was quoted in John F. Kennedy's book A Nation of Immigrants (1958). In 2019, during the Trump administration, Ken Cuccinelli, whom Trump appointed as acting director of U.S. Citizenship and Immigration Services, revised a line from the poem in support of the administration's "public charge rule" to reject applicants for visas or green cards on the basis of income and education. Cuccinelli added the caveat "Give me your tired and your poor who can stand on their own two feet, and who will not become a public charge"; later suggested that the "huddled masses" were European; and downplayed the poem as it was "not actually part of the original Statue of Liberty." Cuccinelli's remark prompted criticism. The Trump administration rule was later blocked by a federal appeals court.

In popular culture 
Parts of the poem also appear in popular culture. The Broadway musical Miss Liberty, with music and lyrics by Irving Berlin, an immigrant himself, used the final stanza beginning "Give me your tired, your poor" as the basis for a song. Joan Baez used the second half of the poem in her lyrics to The Ballad of Sacco and Vanzetti Part 1 which forms parts of Ennio Morricone's soundtrack to the 1971 Italian film Sacco & Vanzetti, based on the events surrounding the trial and judicial execution of the Italian-born American anarchists Nicola Sacco and Bartolomeo Vanzetti.

The American Jewish Historical Society in New York City has a "New Colossus Project" of exhibitions, videos, and curriculum related to the poem. It also hosts the "New Colossus Translation Project" (produced by Alicia Ostriker, Mihaela Moscaliuc, and Tess O'Dwyer); it publishes translations of the poem into other languages by poets from around the world, including Emma Lazarus’ biographer Esther Schor's translation into Esperanto, Karen Alkalay-Gut's into Hebrew, Ming Di's into Chinese, Dunya Mikhail's into Arabic, and Giannina Braschi into Spanish.

The poem is frequently recited or referenced in works of fiction, such as literature, film, and video games. Some examples include a version of the poem recited in Cixin Liu's The Dark Forest (first published in Chinese in 2008 and in English in 2015), the second volume of the science-fiction trilogy Remembrance of Earth's Past. The poem was also read in the 1941 film Hold Back the Dawn as well as being recited by the heroine in Alfred Hitchcock's wartime film Saboteur. It is recited by B.J. Blazkowicz at the end of the 2014 video game Wolfenstein: The New Order.  The poem is also the subtitle of the game's sequel: Wolfenstein II: The New Colossus. In Dimension 20 : The Unsleeping City, Emma Lazarus was a sorceress, and she prophesied or spoke into being the campaign's plot.

References

External links 

  (multiple versions)
 . Emma Lazarus' handwritten sonnet "The New Colossus" The poem itself, having been published in 1883 or at the very latest 1903 is in the public domain.
 
 Manuscript notebook from the Emma Lazarus collection at the American Jewish Historical Society.  Includes an undated manuscript version of "The New Colossus".
 Cavitch, Max (2008). "Emma Lazarus and the Golem of Liberty".  In The Traffic in Poems: Nineteenth-Century Poetry and Transatlantic Exchange. Meredith L. McGill (ed.). New Brunswick: Rutgers University Press. app. 97–122.
 
 The New Colossus - Emma Lazarus as read on YouTube

1883 poems
American poems
Articles containing video clips
Jewish American literature
Jewish poetry
Sonnets
Statue of Liberty
Works about immigration to the United States
Colossus of Rhodes